The Whale is a 2022 American psychological drama film directed by Darren Aronofsky and written by Samuel D. Hunter, based on his 2012 play of the same name. The film stars Brendan Fraser, Sadie Sink, Hong Chau, Ty Simpkins, and Samantha Morton. The plot follows a reclusive, morbidly obese English teacher who tries to restore his relationship with his teenage daughter.

The Whale premiered at the 79th Venice International Film Festival on September 4, 2022, and had a limited theatrical release in the United States on December 9, before a wide release on December 21, by A24. The film polarized critics, though the cast's performances, particularly those of Fraser and Chau, received praise. It has grossed $43 million against a budget of $3 million. For his performance, Fraser won Best Actor at the Academy Awards, Critics' Choice Awards, and Screen Actors Guild Awards, and was nominated at the Golden Globe Awards and British Academy Film Awards. The film also won the Academy Award for Best Makeup and Hairstyling, and received a Best Supporting Actress nomination for Chau, as well as a nomination for the Producers Guild of America Award for Best Theatrical Motion Picture.

Plot

Charlie, a morbidly obese and reclusive English instructor, teaches online writing courses but keeps his webcam off, ashamed of his physical appearance. His nurse and only friend Liz urges him to visit a hospital for severe risk of congestive heart failure, but Charlie claims he cannot afford medical care. He is also visited by Thomas, a missionary for the New Life Church who wants Charlie to be saved. Charlie frequently orders pizza, following an established routine with delivery driver Dan, who drops off the pizza and collects payment from the mailbox without the two ever interacting face-to-face.

Charlie hopes to reconnect with Ellie, his estranged teenage daughter whom he has not seen in eight years. Charlie offers her the $120,000 in his bank account if she spends time with him without her mother's knowledge. Ellie relents when he agrees to help rewrite a school essay, though he says she must also write in a notebook he gives her. Liz is disgruntled by Thomas' visits and chastises him. Liz reveals she is the adopted daughter of New Life's head pastor and that Alan, Charlie's deceased boyfriend whose death from suicide due to religious guilt caused Charlie to start uncontrollably binge-eating, was her brother. Despite Liz's objections, Thomas still believes his mission is to help Charlie.

Charlie's health begins to rapidly decline; Liz brings him a wheelchair so he can remain mobile. Ellie places crushed Ambien into Charlie's food. After he falls asleep, Thomas arrives and Ellie questions him while the two smoke marijuana. Thomas admits he stole his youth group's money and ran away from home because he felt unfulfilled. Ellie secretly records their conversation. Out of concern, Liz brings Mary, Charlie's ex-wife and Ellie's mother, to visit. A heated exchange occurs in which Charlie reveals the amount in his bank account that he planned to leave Ellie, causing Liz to storm out over being lied to about why he avoided medical treatment. Alone, Mary and Charlie argue about the breakdown of their marriage and their failures as parents. It's revealed that Charlie abandoned Mary and Ellie to be with Alan, which resulted in a divorce and his estrangement from Ellie. As Mary leaves, Charlie admits he is hoping Ellie will be the confirmation he needs that he did "one thing right with his life".

During a routine pizza delivery, delivery driver Dan sees Charlie for the first time after waiting for Charlie to go outside so he could glimpse him. Dan looks shocked and runs off without saying a word. As a result Charlie experiences a severe binge-eating episode during which he sends a profanity-laden email to his students, telling them to disregard the classwork and just write back "something honest". Thomas visits Charlie one last time to inform him that he is moving back home after Ellie sent his confession to his former youth group and family, who have forgiven him and are welcoming him home. He attempts to preach to Charlie, but Charlie chastises Thomas when he attributes Alan's death to his being a homosexual.

Charlie reveals during his next class that he is being replaced due to the email he sent, and he reads some of the students' submissions. To reciprocate their honesty, he switches on his webcam for the first time, and the students react with shock; he calmly proclaims the only thing that matters is the honest things his students had written, then ends the class by smashing his computer.

Liz returns and comforts Charlie as his health worsens. Ellie arrives to furiously confront Charlie over an essay he rewrote for her; Charlie replaced it with a critical essay of Moby-Dick she wrote in eighth grade, as he considered it the most honest essay he's ever read. Ellie initially rebukes Charlie as he attempts to reconcile one final time, though she reads aloud the essay at Charlie's insistence. Charlie stands up and walks toward her without assistance, which he had tried but failed to do during Ellie's first visit. As Ellie finishes reading, they both smile at each other, and Charlie begins to float as he's engulfed in a bright white light.

Cast
 Brendan Fraser as Charlie, a morbidly obese and reclusive English instructor
 Sadie Sink as Ellie, Charlie's estranged daughter
 Jacey Sink as young Ellie
 Ty Simpkins as Thomas, a Christian missionary
 Hong Chau as Liz, a nurse who is Charlie's only friend
 Samantha Morton as Mary, Charlie's ex-wife and Ellie's mother
 Sathya Sridharan as Dan, a pizza delivery man

Production

Writing and casting
Aronofsky has said that he tried to get the film made for over a decade, but could not do it because he struggled to find the right actor to portray Charlie. After seeing portions of Fraser's performance in a trailer for Journey to the End of the Night (2006), he decided that Fraser could be a good choice.

The original play was set in 2009, but the setting was updated to 2016 because Hunter wanted to show the events as being before a major "seismic change", and since doing so would make it clear that the play's events were prior to the COVID-19 pandemic. In the original play Thomas, an Evangelical Christian missionary, is instead a Mormon missionary. The Liz character, in the original play and in the screenplay, did not have her ethnic background or race specified. The actress chosen to portray Liz, Chau, is of Asian heritage. The final screenplay specifies that Liz was adopted as a way of accommodating Chau's casting; this was not in the initial revisions of the screenplay. Chau argued that Liz should have an unkempt look and should be tattooed, aspects that were incorporated into the character.

On January 11, 2021, it was announced that A24 had obtained global distribution rights to The Whale, directed by Aronofsky and starring Fraser. Hong Chau, Sadie Sink, and Samantha Morton joined the cast in February, followed by Ty Simpkins in March. Sathya Sridharan joined the cast at an unknown date.

At one point, the film was set to star James Corden with Tom Ford directing, but Ford left due to creative differences. George Clooney also briefly considered directing the film, but ultimately declined.

Filming
Principal photography ran from March 8 to April 7, 2021, in Newburgh, New York. Post-production began later in April.

For the role, Fraser spent four hours each day being fitted with prosthetics that weighed up to 300 lb (136 kg). He also consulted with the Obesity Action Coalition and worked with a dance instructor for months before filming began in order to determine how his character would move with the excess weight.

Hunter stated that it is up to the viewer to interpret whether Charlie actually walks in the ending scene, and Fraser argued that Charlie is finally "liberated". Sink stated that her character is emotionally traumatized and that Charlie is able to look through a façade that Ellie puts up as a barrier between herself and her father.

Release

The Whale had its world premiere at the 79th Venice International Film Festival on September 4, 2022, where it received a six-minute standing ovation. It made its North American premiere at the 2022 Toronto International Film Festival on September 11, 2022. It had a limited theatrical release in the United States on December 9, 2022, then expanded to wide release on December 21.

The film was released on VOD platforms on February 21, 2023, and was released on Blu-ray and DVD on March 14, 2023.

Reception

Box office
, The Whale has grossed $17.2 million in the United States and Canada, and $25.7 million in other territories, for a worldwide total of $43 million.

The film grossed $1 million in its third weekend (expanding from six theaters to 603) and $1.6 million over the four-day Christmas frame, then $1.4 million in its fourth weekend. It then expanded to 1,500 venues on the sixth week of its theatrical run and grossed $11 million domestically, somewhat temporarily breaking the ongoing trend of the general public losing interest in prestige films in a moviegoing environment altered by the COVID-19 pandemic. These results were attributed to the praise and awards buzz for Fraser's performance.

Critical response

Review aggregator website Rotten Tomatoes reported an approval rating of 65% based on 325 reviews, with an average rating of 6.6/10. The site's critics consensus reads, "Held together by a killer Brendan Fraser, The Whale sings a song of empathy that will leave most viewers blubbering." 

The Whale received positive feedback at the Toronto International Film Festival, with particular praise for Fraser's, Chau's and Sink's performances. When the film had a limited theatrical release, Variety reported that the reviews "have been polarizing, with others [than Varietys review] criticizing the film's portrayal of fat people". Glenn Kenny of RogerEbert.com praised Aronofsky's direction and Fraser's performance, writing that the "story is one of different levels of heartbreak and human misunderstanding" and "Aronofsky and Fraser have taken substantive risks, in the name of an insistent empathy". Robbie Collin of The Telegraph, gave it a perfect five stars, writing: "Fraser seals his comeback in a sensational film of rare compassion."

Richard Roeper of the Chicago Sun-Times described the film as "empathetic, haunting, beautiful, heartbreakingly moving story of a broken man..." He named it best film of the year and deemed Fraser's performance as his career's best. Variety chief film critic Owen Gleiberman also praised Fraser, calling him "slyer, subtler, more haunting than he has ever been." Matthew Creith of Out Front wrote: "The highlight of The Whale comes from an outstanding turn from Hong Chau, who gives a memorable performance in a vital role that balances Charlie's outlandish behavior." Hannah Strong of Little White Lies praised Fraser and the "strong ensemble", highlighting Sink's "tricky role" in which she "captures the anger and sadness that comes from parental abandonment", and stating that while Aronofsky "isn't a particularly empathetic filmmaker" and The Whale is not without flaws, the film "reflects tenderly on shame, guilt, and the human impulse to care and be cared for".

Richard Lawson of Vanity Fair wrote that the film "meant to be a poignant consideration of guilt, sexuality, religion, remorse" but "we really only know that because the movie shouts it at us". He also criticized Fraser's performance as "lost". Mark Hanson of Slant Magazine felt that Aronofsky reins in his "typically ostentatious style" but "considering how Libatique's camera leeringly treats Charlie as an unsightly object of pity throughout, it's difficult to deny the film's fatphobia, though its mawkishness is no less oppressive". Katie Rife of Polygon wrote: "If you look at The Whale as a fable, its moral is that it's the responsibility of the abused to love and forgive their abusers. The movie thinks it's saying 'You don't understand; he's fat because he's suffering.' But it ends up saying 'You don't understand; we have to be cruel to fat people because we are suffering.' Aronofsky and Hunter's biblical metaphor aside, fat people didn't volunteer to serve as repositories for society's rage and contempt."

Controversy

The film has received criticism for its portrayal of the main character. Time magazine explained the controversy, stating: "Some of the film's critics believe it perpetuates tired tropes of fat people as suffering, chronically depressed and binge eating." On the podcast Don't Let This Flop, EJ Dickson said the film was met with criticism for its use of a prosthetic suit instead of casting an obese actor, with accusations that it "stigmatizes and mocks fat people". On NPR's culture section, Jaclyn Diaz reported that this criticism extends to detractors calling the film's premise "inherently dehumanizing".

Writing for The New York Times, Roxane Gay expressed her opinion that the film's empathy was only superficial and that the depiction of Charlie reinforced anti-fat stereotypes and preconceptions. She wrote that although Aronofsky said he wanted to give an empathetic portrayal she "was bewildered because an empathetic portrayal isn't at all what was conveyed onscreen. As I looked around the audience, I was struck by the fact that there were only four or so fat people in the audience and none on the stage."

Director Darren Aronofsky responded to the controversy by defending the film saying the criticisms "make no sense". Aronofsky said that "actors have been using makeup since the beginning of acting—that's one of their tools. And the lengths we went to portray the realism of the makeup has never been done before", adding that "people with obesity are generally written as bad guys or as punch lines, we wanted to create a fully worked-out character who has bad parts about him and good parts about him". He said of fat people that "they get judged everywhere they go on the planet, by most people. This film shows that, like everyone, we are all human".

Accolades

References

External links
 Official screenplay
 

2022 films
2022 drama films
2022 independent films
2022 LGBT-related films
2020s American films
2020s English-language films
2020s psychological drama films
A24 (company) films
American films based on plays
American independent films
American LGBT-related films
American psychological drama films
Casting controversies in film
Films about educators
Films about father–daughter relationships
Films about obesity
 Films critical of Christianity and Christians
 Films critical of religion
Films directed by Darren Aronofsky
Films produced by Darren Aronofsky
Films scored by Rob Simonsen
Films set in 2016
Films set in Idaho
Films shot in New York (state)
LGBT-related controversies in film
LGBT-related drama films
Protozoa Pictures films
Films that won the Academy Award for Best Makeup
Films featuring a Best Actor Academy Award-winning performance